Alejandro Durán Fernández (born in San Luis Potosí, Mexico), is a Mexican television actor.

Filmography

Films

Television

External links 

Year of birth missing (living people)
Living people
21st-century Mexican male actors
Male actors from San Luis Potosí
Mexican male film actors
Mexican male telenovela actors